"We Are Happy Women" is a song recorded by Japanese singer-songwriter Mai Kuraki, taken from her twelfth studio album Kimi Omou: Shunkashūtō (2018). It was released on March 2, 2018, by Northern Music and served as the campaign song for Happy Woman, an official project for protecting Japanese women's human rights.

Live performance 
On March 4, 2018, Kuraki performed "We Are Happy Women" in an event, Happy Woman Ceremony which was held at Yebisu Garden Place in Tokyo.

Track listing

Charts

Release history

References

2018 singles
2018 songs
Mai Kuraki songs
Songs written by Mai Kuraki
Songs written by Aika Ohno
Song recordings produced by Daiko Nagato